Rom Houben is a comatose Belgian man who was claimed to have the ability to type through facilitated communication, a scientifically discredited technique.  Houben was comatose and in a vegetative state for 23 years after a near-fatal automobile accident, but whom according to several of his caregivers, was conscious and paralyzed during the entirety of his hospital stay. In 2010, the claim that Houben was able to communicate was rejected when communication could not be replicated with a different facilitator and by hiding the object to be identified from the view of the facilitator.

Background
Houben was diagnosed with total locked-in syndrome by Belgian neurologist Steven Laureys in 2006 with the help of modern brain imaging techniques and equipment. It was claimed that he could communicate by typing into a keyboard with his right hand supported by a communication facilitator. However, the claims that Houben is able to communicate by typing have been widely disputed.

Houben's case is used to question the current methods of diagnosing vegetative state and to arguments against withholding care from such patients. However, some bioethicists believe that the case, if confirmed, may provide stronger arguments for withdrawing or withholding from vegetative patients.

While Houben was diagnosed in 2006, his case, first reported in a BMC Neurology paper in July 2009 without him being named, was only brought to wider public attention after German weekly magazine Der Spiegel ran a story on it in November 2009 which was subsequently picked up by media outlets around the world, receiving extensive coverage.

Controversy
Bioethicist Jacob M. Appel of New York University has suggested that the case may be either "a matter of wishful thinking", or "a cruel and manipulative hoax" that will be used by political conservatives in their public relations campaign against the right to die.

The method used to allegedly communicate with Houben is known as "facilitated communication", which the Association for Behavior Analysis International, the American Academy of Child and Adolescent Psychiatry and the American Association on Intellectual and Developmental Disabilities have called a "discredited technique", the use of which is "unwarranted and unethical". Skeptics, including PZ Myers and James Randi, contend that facilitated communication does not involve actual communication with the disabled, but rather with the people playing the role of the "facilitator". Randi writes that claims of Houben's facilitated communication amount to a "cruel farce." Video footage shows the "facilitator", Linda Wouters, holding Houben's hand as his finger is being used to type at a rapid pace, even though the subject appears to be slumped over with his eyes closed.  Neurologist Steven Novella argued that there was "little doubt" that Houben's typing is the result of bogus facilitated communication.

Additionally, Arthur Caplan, a bioethics professor at the University of Pennsylvania, has claimed that the statements Houben allegedly made through his facilitator seem unnatural for someone disabled and unable to speak for decades. Through Wouters, Houben is quoted as saying "Now I can communicate and talk via facilitated communication. Not everyone believes in this form of communication. It is a controversial method but, for me, it is vital to life. At last, my views can be heard and my feelings expressed."

Initially, Laureys said that he had verified that the facilitated communication was genuine, by showing Houben objects when the facilitator was not present in the room, and later asking Houben to recall those objects. Novella suggested that Laureys had not used proper controls.

In an interview with the Belgian newspaper De Standaard, Laureys stated that he was not involved in the choice of communication method and refused to comment on its validity. He even claimed to be "a skeptic [himself]" and acknowledged that "the bad reputation of some forms [of facilitated communication] is justified". He also claimed that Houben's case was only made public because Der Spiegel wanted to report on his study and was looking for a "human element" to the story: "I knew that Rom and his family were willing to collaborate because they had done so before [for a Flemish TV channel]." However, he also criticized some of the negative feedback for "judging the evidence only on the basis of some video footage" and declared that "given time, we will look scientifically into the different ways of communication. For us, this seems to be the proper way."

Disproof
Laureys later concluded that messages attributed to Houben through Wouters' facilitation were not, in fact, coming from Houben after all. After the early tests, further testing met with resistance. Using a different facilitator, subsequent testing under properly controlled conditions in which fifteen objects which were shown to Houben over a period of weeks was performed, Houben was unable to communicate knowledge of any of the objects which had been shown to him during the facilitator's absence. Novella attributed Laureys' prior error to likely insufficient experience with facilitated communication.

See also
 Clever Hans – 20th-century horse claimed to have been able to do mathematics

References

1963 births
Living people
20th-century Belgian people
People with severe brain damage
Medical controversies in Belgium
People with traumatic brain injuries
People with disorders of consciousness